Era Natarasan (born 8 December 1964), popularly known as Ayesha Natarasan, is an Indian writer of children's books. He writes in Tamil and English. He is the author of Ayisha (in English) / Ayesha (a Novella) that has sold millions of copies in 12 languages. He has written more than 80 books most of them on science and Science Fiction including Vigyana vikramadhithyan kadhaigal which won the "Bal Sahitya Puraskar Award" for Children Literature, awarded by Sahitya Academy.

Life and career

He is the Principal (Head master) of the Krishnasamy Memorial Matric Higher Secondary School, in the coastal town of Cuddalore near Puducherry, India.

Natarasan started his writing career as a poet in the Tamil weekly Ananda Vikatan in 1982 latter got interested to write short- stories Science and Science fiction for children so for he has written 83 books (72 in Tamil and 11 in English). The Vigyana Vikramadhithyan Kadhaikal(2009) has in itself the history of the medical inventions such as, polio vaccine, insulin, and malaria vaccine, which received the Bala Sahitya Puraskar the Annual Sahitya Academy Award for children literature in 2014.

His recent work for teachers Idhu yarudaya vagupparai (Whose Classroom Is It?) has received the Tamil Valarchithurai Virudhu in 2015, the award he has already received in 2001 for his book on Mathematics Kanidhathin kadhai. Natarasan has brought a series (10 books) in English under the title Scientific Revolution on ten of the most notable scientists such as Galileo Galilei, Gregor Mendel, Marie Curie, and Albert Einstein. He is the writer and editor of The Puthagam Pesudhu – a Tamil monthly for books.

Short films 
Natarasan's four stories have been made into short films.
 Ayesha – was adopted into a 28 minutes short film by B. sivakumar Released in year of 2000, short film Ayesha won the National Film Award – Best short film of the year (National Film Festival, New Delhi)
  Madhi – another short story (which was published by India Today (t) magazine) about the pathetic every day life of the third gender was filmed into a short film by cinematographer – Editor B. Lenin.
  Rathathin Vannathil (the color of Blood) story which received the Ilakkiya chindhanai Award, was made into a feature film in the title Chellamma by Director Pa.sivakumar.
  Vattathin Pakkangal (the sides of circle) was filmed as a feature film again by Director Pa.sivakumar.
    Ayesha Natarasan also appears in a supporting role in Director Thangar Bachan's famous film Ammavin Kaipesi.

Educational activism 
As an educational scholar and psychologist he is an activist supporting alternative education. He has translated Paulo Freire's Pedagogy of the Oppressed, a book on education into Tamil. He served as a master resource Person on Right to Education Act for UNICEF Sponsored workshops in Tamil Nadu. He played a major role as the member secretary in the Vasanthi Devi Committee on Alternate Education Policy (citizen's charter – against PM Modi's New Education Policy). Ayesha Natarasan was in the Text Book committee formed by the Govt of Tamil Nadu on the eve of the common syllabus formation. As an education activist Natarasan has periodically participated in many education debates on television as a key speaker, including Star Vijay(Neeya Naana), Sun TV (India) (virundhinar pakkam) etc., His articles and interviews on education have appeared in many leading magazines/Dailies such as The Hindu, Ananda Vikatan, The Times of India (city) Kungumam Vazhikatti, kalki Magazine etc., Era.Natarasan is also an active participant, Resource Person cum trainer in book festivals children content seminars and literary meets. Ayesha Era.Natarasan was the Chief Organiser of the "National Children's Book Festival" conducted in Cuddalore South India (from 10 to 15 November 2017 ) collectively by National Book Trust, Books For Children and Sahitya Akademi involving more than 50,000 children. Era Natarasan has given a discourse about the theme of "Books That Changed The World" in Anna Centenary Library on the date of 30 June 2018.

Other awards and honours

Notable works

Vaasik kalam (2017, Bharathi Puthakalayam)
Oru Thozhanum Moonru Nanbargalum (2006, Bharathi Puthakalayam)
Rose (2002, Books for children)
Ayesha (2000, Bharathi Puthakalayam)
kodhaidoscope (2014, Bharathi Puthakalayam)
Srinrvasa Ramanujam-125 (Bharathi Puthakalayam)
Kanitha Methaigalin Facebook, . (2012, Books for children)
Neengalum Vingani Aaga Vendum Endru Vrumbugireerkala,  Bharathi Puthakalayam
Nano Thozhilnutpam,  (2010, Bharathi Puthakalayam)
Eyarpiyal Parisothanaigal,  (2000, Bharathi Puthakalayam)
Booma.  (Bharathi Puthakalayam)
Darwin School,  (2014, Bharathi Puthakalayam)
Ureka Count,  (2000, vikatan)
Michael Faraday (Bharathi Puthakalayam)
Oru Thooya Mozhiyin Thuyara Kuzhandhaikal,  (Bharathi Puthakalayam)
Madhi Ennum manidhanin maranam kurithu , (Sneha publication)
Palitheen Paigal (novel),  (Bharathi Puthakalayam)
Ithu Yarudaiya Vagupparai,  (2013, Bharathi Puthakalayam)
Ulaga Kalviyalargal,  (2009, Bharathi Puthakalayam)
Semmnozhigal, (Bharathi Puthakalayam)
Ulagileye Magizhchiyana Siruvan,  (2012, Bharathi Puthakalayam)
Nee Erumbukalai Nesikkiraayaa,  (Bharathi Puthakalayam)
Vaanga Ariviyal Pesalaam,  (Bharathi Puthakalayam)
Uruvaakum Ullam,  (Bharathi Puthakalayam)
Pavlov,  (Books for children)
Antoine Lavisier,  (Books for children)
Issac Newton,  (Bharathi Puthakalayam)
Wings of Learning (will RTE service) (Indian University Press)

See also 
 List of Indian writers

References

External links 

 

Living people
Novelists from Tamil Nadu
Tamil-language writers
Tamil writers
Recipients of the Sahitya Akademi Award in Tamil
Indian children's writers
Educators from Tamil Nadu
21st-century Indian educational theorists
Children's writers in Tamil
Indian science fiction writers
1964 births
People from Tiruchirappalli district
21st-century Indian novelists